State Trunk Highway 72 (often called Highway 72, STH-72 or WIS 72) is a  state highway state highway in Pierce and Dunn counties in Wisconsin, United States. It runs in west central Wisconsin from US Highway 10 (US 10) and US 63 east of Ellsworth east to WIS 25 in Downsville. The road is maintained by the Wisconsin Department of Transportation (WisDOT).

Route description

WIS 72 begins at an intersection with US 10 and US 63 in the Town of Ellsworth in Pierce County, east of the village of the same name. From here, the highway heads east running concurrently with US 63. The roads pass through a rural area together until US 63 splits off to the north. WIS 72 continues eastward, intersecting County Trunk Highway DD (CTH-DD) before entering the Town of El Paso. After crossing the Rush River, the highway briefly follows the river's edge before continuing eastward. The road passes through the communities of Waverly and Rock Elm, then turns northeast toward Elmwood. In Elmwood, the highway intersects WIS 128 at that route's southern terminus, then turns east and leaves the village. Past Elmwood, WIS 72 then enters the Town of Weston in Dunn County. The road heads east through farmland, crossing the Eau Galle River after meeting CTH-C for the first time. It then intersects CTH-D and CTH-K before entering the Town of Dunn. The highway curves to the southeast before terminating at an intersection with WIS 25 and CTH-C in Downsville. The Red Cedar River lies immediately to the east of the terminus.

Major intersections

See also

References

External links

072
Transportation in Pierce County, Wisconsin
Transportation in Dunn County, Wisconsin